Aakarshit Gomel (born 3 December 1993) is an Indian cricketer. He made his first-class debut on 12 February 2020, for Mumbai in the 2019–20 Ranji Trophy. He made his Twenty20 debut on 19 January 2021, for Mumbai in the 2020–21 Syed Mushtaq Ali Trophy. He made his List A debut on 12 December 2021, for Mumbai in the 2021–22 Vijay Hazare Trophy.

References

External links
 

1993 births
Living people
Indian cricketers
Mumbai cricketers
Place of birth missing (living people)